Boehm is a surname (including a list of people with the name).

Boehm may also refer to:

Music
 Boehm flute

Science and technology
 Boehm., botanical abbreviation for Georg Rudolf Boehmer (1723–1803)
 Boehm syndrome, a symptom-specific map-dot-fingerprint dystrophy of the cornea

See also
 Böhm, a surname (including a list of people with the name)
 Böhme (disambiguation)
 Bohm (disambiguation)